Amanda Martín is an activist in the Workers' Party.  She is also a history teacher and a trade unionist.

She became a member of the legislature of the Autonomous City of Buenos Aires in June 2021, as a candidate of the Workers' Left Front; she will hold the seat until December 2023.

References

External links
Martín's website (Spanish)
article on Martín taking her seat (Spanish)
Youtube video of Martín taking her seat (Spanish)

Workers' Party (Argentina) politicians
Living people
21st-century Argentine educators
Argentine trade unionists
Argentine schoolteachers
Argentine women educators
Year of birth missing (living people)
21st-century Argentine women politicians
21st-century Argentine politicians
Women trade unionists
Politicians from Buenos Aires